Llandegwning  is a village and former civil parish in the Welsh county of Gwynedd.  The parish was abolished in 1934, and incorporated into Botwnnog.

References

Villages in Gwynedd
Botwnnog